Horkelia californica (syn: Potentilla californica), known by the common name California horkelia, is a species of flowering plant in the rose family.

It is endemic to California, where it grows on scrubby coastal and inland mountain slopes, primarily in the California Coast Ranges and western Sierra Nevada foothills.

Description
Horkelia californica is a clumping perennial herb producing erect green stems variable in height from 10 centimeters to over a meter. The green leaves are up to 40 centimeters long and are made up of hairy, rounded, toothed leaflets each up to 6 centimeters in length.

The inflorescence holds solitary and clustered flowers, each with toothed bractlets and thick, pointed sepals. There are five small white petals. Flowers bloom April to July.

References

External links

Jepson Manual Treatment: Horkelia californica
Horkelia californica — U.C. Photo gallery

californica
Endemic flora of California
Flora of the Sierra Nevada (United States)
Natural history of the California chaparral and woodlands
Natural history of the California Coast Ranges
Natural history of the San Francisco Bay Area
Flora without expected TNC conservation status